Erika Ulrich is a Swiss Olympic archer. She represented her country in the women's individual competition at the 1980 Summer Olympics. She came 18th place after both rounds, finishing with 2240 points.

References

1943 births
Living people
Swiss female archers
Olympic archers of Switzerland
Archers at the 1980 Summer Olympics